Longwang may refer to:
Dragon King, a god in Chinese folk religion
Typhoon Longwang, a tropical cyclone impacting China during the 2005 Pacific typhoon season